Cecil is an unincorporated community in Montgomery County, Alabama, United States. Cecil had a post office until it closed on May 20, 1986; it still has its own ZIP code, 36013.

Education

Macon East Academy, a private PK-12 school, serves Cecil as well as Montgomery Public Schools.

References

Unincorporated communities in Montgomery County, Alabama
Unincorporated communities in Alabama